Ireland's Ancient East is a destination marketing brand representing the east coast, and parts of the midlands and south coasts, of Ireland. Unlike the Wild Atlantic Way, the region's tourism trail doesn't have a set driving route, and instead seeks to connect various sights throughout seventeen counties in two provinces. The concept is built around four "pillars": Ancient Ireland, Early Christian Ireland, Medieval Ireland and Anglo Ireland.

Bus Éireann promotes various routes that pass through, or near, landmarks on the trail.

Themes

Historic Heartland 
The "Historic Heartland" includes a number of sites in counties Offaly, Laois, Kildare, Tipperary, Limerick, Carlow, and Kilkenny, including:

 Clonmacnoise
 Kilkenny Castle
 Leixlip
 Limerick
 Maynooth
 Rock of Cashel
 Tipperary (town)

Land of 5000 Dawns 
The "Land of 5000 Dawns" includes a number of sites in counties Cavan, Longford, Louth, Meath, Monaghan, and Westmeath, including:
 Athlone
 Battle of the Boyne site
 Brú na Bóinne
 Dowth
 Hill of Tara
 Kilbeggan Distillery
 Newgrange

Celtic Coast 
The "Celtic Coast" includes parts of counties Wicklow, Wexford, Waterford, and Eastern County Cork, including:
 Blarney Castle
 Cobh
 Enniscorthy
 Glendalough
 Hook Head
 Waterford
 Wexford

References

External links 
  on Discover Ireland

Ireland
Tourist attractions in the Republic of Ireland
Tourism regions of the island of Ireland